Hassan N'Dam N'Jikam (born 18 February 1984) is a French Cameroonian professional boxer. He has held a middleweight world championship twice, including the WBO title in 2012 and the WBA (Regular) title in 2017, and has challenged once for a super-middleweight world title in 2019.

Amateur career
N'dam N'Jikam won a silver medal in the middleweight division at the 2003 All-Africa Games, losing to Ramadan Yasser of Egypt in the final. N'jikam represented Cameroon in the middleweight bracket at the 2004 Olympics, defeating Juan Ubaldo of the Dominican Republic and Andy Lee of Ireland on close countback decisions, but losing in the quarter-finals to eventual gold medallist Gaydarbek Gaydarbekov of Russia. 

Following the Olympics, and having no means of boxing professionally in his native Cameroon,  N'Jikam moved to France due to the shared language.

At the 2016 Olympics, professional boxers were permitted to compete at the Olympics for the first ever time. As one of the few professionals who entered, N'Jikam once again represented Cameroon and qualified for the light-heavyweight bracket, but lost in the first round to Michel Borges of Brazil. This was seen as a surprise to many boxing observers, who predicted that amateurs would not fare well against experienced professionals.

Professional career
N'Jikam made his professional debut on 4 December 2004, scoring a third-round stoppage against Alexis Culit. On 30 October 2010, having fought mainly in his adoptive France, N'Jikam won the vacant WBA interim middleweight title with a close unanimous decision (117-111, 115-114, 115-114) over Avtandil Khurtsidze at the Palais des sports Marcel-Cerdan. 

N'Jikam's only defense of his title was made on 2 April 2011 against Giovanni Lorenzo. He won a wide unanimous decision (119-109, 119-110, 116-111) However, major controversy arose during the fight when N'Jikam was knocked out of the ring by a series of punches from Lorenzo in round five. A WBA official then helped N'Jikam back into the ring, which was against the sanctioning body's rules. Lorenzo's team later argued that this should have been grounds for immediate disqualification, as well as disputing the overly wide scorecards. 

A purse bid was ordered between N'Jikam and WBA (Regular) champion Gennady Golovkin. The purse bid was scheduled for 2 February 2012. However, days before the purse bid  N'Jikam vacated his title rather than face Golovkin. 

On 4 May 2012, N'Jikam won the vacant WBO interim middleweight title via unanimous decision against Max Bursak. 

He was later promoted to full world champion status on 25 August, after Dmitry Pirog was stripped of the title for choosing to fight Gennady Golovkin instead of mandatory challenger N'Jikam. In his first world title defence on 20 October, as well as his first fight in the United States, N'Jikam suffered six knockdowns en route to a unanimous decision loss (107-115, 107-115, 107-115) to Peter Quillin. 

N'Jikam won an IBF title eliminator over Curtis Stevens with a unanimous decision (119-108, 116-111, 116-111). Stevens was knocked down in round 8. A second opportunity to become world champion came on 20 June 2015, against David Lemieux for the vacant IBF middleweight title. N'Jikam again endured multiple knockdowns—four in total—but managed to go the distance to lose on the cards (109-115, 109-115, 110-114).

2016 saw N'Jikam reel off four consecutive victories, with a brief pause in August to compete in the 2016 Olympics. On 17 December, he emphatically re-entered the world title scene by becoming WBA interim middleweight champion for a second time, following a brutal one-punch knockout of Alfonso Blanco in only 22 seconds of the first round. 

N'Jikam then won the full (Regular) title with a controversial split decision (116-111, 115-112, 110-117) win over Ryōta Murata on 27 May 2017. N'Jikam was knocked down in round 4 but survived and got the decision. When the result was announced, the crowd at Ariake Colosseum jeered. The two judges who scored the fight for N'Jikam were immediately suspended and WBA president Gilberto Mendoza issued a public apology. A rematch was immediately ordered by the WBA, and scheduled for 22 October.

On 22 October, Murata decisively beat N'Jikam, who threw in the towel after round 7. Murata's body attack wore his opponent down, he was also able to hurt him with a series of combinations. The fight was attended by 8,500 people at the Ryōgoku Kokugikan. This was N'Jikam's first stoppage loss.

On 22 December, 2018, N'Jikam managed to overcome a knockdown and beat former title-challenger Martin Murray via a majority-decision win. N'Jikam won on the scorecards, 117-112 and 116-112, while the third judge scored the fight a draw, 114-114.

On the Joshua vs Ruiz undercard, N'Jikam fought Callum Smith for his WBA world title. Smith would end up dropping N'Jikam three times. Despite getting up from the third knockdown too, the referee decided to stop the fight and award Smith the victory.

In his next fight, N'Jikam lost again, this time against WBA #1, WBC #6, IBF #8 and WBC #11 Fedor Chudinov in Russia.

On June 8, 2020, N'Jikam announced that he will transition into MMA, signing with French MMA promotion ARES FC.

Professional boxing record

References

External links

2003 All Africa Games results
Hassan N'dam N'Jikam - Profile, News Archive & Current Rankings at Box.Live

1984 births
Living people
Cameroonian male boxers
Boxers at the 2004 Summer Olympics
Boxers at the 2016 Summer Olympics
Olympic boxers of Cameroon
French male boxers
World Boxing Organization champions
World middleweight boxing champions
African Games silver medalists for Cameroon
African Games medalists in boxing
Cameroonian emigrants to France
World Boxing Association champions
Competitors at the 2003 All-Africa Games